Francesco Vitucci (born 5 April 1963) is an Italian basketball head coach, currently managing New Basket Brindisi in the Italian Lega Basket Serie A (LBA).

Coaching career
Vitucci began his career as a basketball coach with the Reyer Venezia's youth team, and at the same time he was the assistant coach for seven years on the senior team of Venice. He later became the head coach of the team and achieved the promotion to Serie A in 1996.

After the bankruptcy of the club he went to Andrea Costa Imola. He took part of the Korać Cup and the Saporta Cup.

In 2003 he became assistant coach of Benetton Treviso, and stayed for seven years.

In 2010 Scandone Avellino offered him the bench as head coach for the next two seasons in Serie A in place of Cesare Pancotto.

On 7 June 2012 Vitucci became the head coach of Pallacanestro Varese signing a contract for two seasons. Varese won the 2012–13 regular season with 46 points (23 victories and 7 defeats), but in the playoffs they were eliminated by Montepaschi Siena (4–3 in the series) at the semifinals.

In July he left Pallacanestro Varese and returned to Scandone Avellino for two more seasons.

In December 2015 he became the head coach of Auxilium Torino.

On 14 December 2017 Vitucci became head coach of New Basket Brindisi.

Honours and titles
Head coach
Lega Basket Serie A: 1
Pallacanestro Varese: 2000

References

External links
Vitucci Profile at Legabasket.it 

1963 births
Living people
Italian basketball coaches
Pallacanestro Treviso coaches
Pallacanestro Varese coaches
Sportspeople from Venice
Reyer Venezia coaches
Auxilium Pallacanestro Torino coaches
Pallacanestro Reggiana coaches
New Basket Brindisi coaches